Wallace is a town in Codington County, South Dakota, United States. The population was 91 at the 2020 census. It is part of the Watertown, South Dakota Micropolitan Statistical Area.

History
The town was named for the original owner of the town site. Wallace is the birthplace of Hubert Humphrey, the Vice President of the United States from 1965 to 1969.

Hubert Humphrey was born in a room over his father's drugstore in Wallace. He was the son of Ragnild Kristine Sannes (1883–1973), a Norwegian immigrant, and Hubert Horatio Humphrey Sr. (1882–1949). Humphrey spent most of his youth in nearby Doland, a town with a population of approximately 600. His father was a licensed pharmacist and merchant who served as mayor and a town council member; he also served briefly in the South Dakota state legislature and was a South Dakota delegate to the 1944 and 1948 Democratic National Conventions. In the late 1920s, a severe economic downturn hit Doland; both of the town's banks closed and Humphrey's father struggled to keep his store open.

After his son graduated from Doland High School, Hubert Sr. left the area and opened a new drugstore in the larger town of Huron (population 11,000), where he hoped to improve his fortunes.

Geography
Wallace is located at  (45.085069, -97.478896).

Wallace has been assigned the ZIP code 57272 and the FIPS place code 68420.

Demographics

2010 census
As of the census of 2010, there were 85 people, 34 households, and 24 families residing in the town. The racial makeup of the town was 96.5% White, 2.4% African American, and 1.2% from two or more races.

There were 34 households, of which 38.2% had children under the age of 18 living with them, 47.1% were married couples living together, 17.6% had a female householder with no husband present, 5.9% had a male householder with no wife present, and 29.4% were non-families. 29.4% of all households were made up of individuals, and 8.8% had someone living alone who was 65 years of age or older. The average household size was 2.50 and the average family size was 3.13.

The median age in the town was 34.8 years. 35.3% of residents were under the age of 18; 5.8% were between the ages of 18 and 24; 18.9% were from 25 to 44; 29.5% were from 45 to 64; and 10.6% were 65 years of age or older. The gender makeup of the town was 50.6% male and 49.4% female.

2000 census
As of the census of 2000, there were 86 people, 37 households, and 23 families residing in the town. The population density was 637.8 people per square mile (255.4/km2). There were 45 housing units at an average density of 333.7 per square mile (133.7/km2). The racial makeup of the town was 100.00% White.

There were 37 households, out of which 35.1% had children under the age of 18 living with them, 54.1% were married couples living together, 5.4% had a female householder with no husband present, and 37.8% were non-families. 37.8% of all households were made up of individuals, and 27.0% had someone living alone who was 65 years of age or older. The average household size was 2.32 and the average family size was 3.13.

In the town, the population was spread out, with 33.7% under the age of 18, 3.5% from 18 to 24, 27.9% from 25 to 44, 9.3% from 45 to 64, and 25.6% who were 65 years of age or older. The median age was 34 years. For every 100 females, there were 72.0 males. For every 100 females age 18 and over, there were 83.9 males.

The median income for a household in the town was $27,708, and the median income for a family was $33,438. Males had a median income of $33,750 versus $24,063 for females. The per capita income for the town was $14,677. There were no families and 9.1% of the population living below the poverty line, including no under eighteens and 18.2% of those over 64.

References

Towns in Codington County, South Dakota
Towns in South Dakota
Watertown, South Dakota micropolitan area